The 1988-89 Los Angeles Clippers season was their 19th season in the NBA, and their 5th season in Los Angeles. The Clippers won the Draft Lottery, and selected Danny Manning from the University of Kansas with the first overall pick in the 1988 NBA draft, then selected Hersey Hawkins out of Bradley University with the sixth pick, but then traded him to the Philadelphia 76ers for Charles D. Smith from the University of Pittsburgh, and acquired rookie guard Gary Grant from the Seattle SuperSonics. However, Manning would only play just 26 games due to a right knee injury, as the Clippers continued to struggle posting a dreadful 19-game losing streak between January and February, and a 13-game losing streak between February and March. Head coach Gene Shue was fired after a 10–28 start, and was replaced with assistant Don Casey. The Clippers held an 11–37 record at the All-Star break, and finished last place in the Pacific Division with a 21–61 record.

Second-year forward Ken Norman showed improvement, averaging 18.1 points, 8.3 rebounds and 1.3 steals per game, and finished tied in fourth place in Most Improved Player voting, while Manning averaged 16.7 points, 6.6 rebounds and 1.7 steals per game, and Smith provided the team with 16.3 points, 6.5 rebounds and 1.5 blocks per game, and was named to the NBA All-Rookie First Team. In addition, Benoit Benjamin averaged 16.4 points, 8.8 rebounds and 2.8 blocks per game, while Quintin Dailey contributed 16.1 points and 1.3 steals per game, Grant provided with 11.9 points, 7.1 assists and 2.0 steals per game, and second-year forward Reggie Williams contributed 10.2 points and 1.3 steals per game. Following the season, Dailey was released to free agency.

For the season, the Clippers changed the jersey number colors on their road uniforms from blue to white. These uniforms only lasted for just one season.

Draft picks

Roster

Roster notes
 This is forward Eric White's second tour of duty with the franchise after playing briefly for the Utah Jazz. He previously played for the team in March and April in 1988.

Regular season

Season standings

z - clinched division title
y - clinched division title
x - clinched playoff spot

Record vs. opponents

Game log

Player statistics

Awards and records
 Charles Smith, NBA All-Rookie Team 1st Team

Transactions
The Clippers were involved in the following transactions during the 1988–89 season.

Trades

Free agents

Additions

Subtractions

Player Transactions Citation:

References

Los Angeles Clippers seasons